"Nagisa ni Matsuwaru Et Cetera" is the 4th single released by Japanese pop duo Puffy AmiYumi on April 4, 1997.  In the first episode of the Japanese drama "Love Generation", Matsu Takako and Kimura Takuya sing karaoke to this song while doing the punching moves from the music video.

The song is also notable for having the alternative title of '"Electric Beach Fever"' in Puffy's 2002 U.S. release An Illustrated History (but is not a direct translation of the original Japanese title). Lining up the single's cover with the single cover from Circuit no musume also results in one big picture.

Track listing
 Nagisa ni Matsuwaru Et Cetera
 Nagisa ni Matsuwaru Et Cetera (Original Karaoke)

References

Puffy AmiYumi songs
1997 singles
Oricon Weekly number-one singles
1997 songs